List of notable Trinitarians, who were former students of Trinity College, Perth, CBC Perth (1938-1961, see List of Old Aquinians for the period 1894-1937), &
St Patrick's Boy School, Perth (1878-1963).

Government

Head of government
 Ray O'Connor (1926-2013) - Premier of Western Australia (St Patrick's Boys School, Perth)

Executive branch

Cabinet
 Graham Edwards - Dowding Ministry 1987-1990, Lawrence Ministry 1990-1993, MLC for North Metropolitan, also elected to APH for Cowan (CBC Perth)
 Chris Ellison – First, Second, Third and Fourth Howard Ministries, Australian Senator for Western Australia
Nick Griffiths - First Gallop Ministry 2001-2005, President of the Western Australian Legislative Council, MLC for East Metropolitan
John Harman (1932-1998) - Second Tonkin Ministry 1973-1974, Speaker of the Legislative Assembly 1983-1986, MLA for Maylands (St Patrick's Boys School, Perth)

Other executive
 Michael Keenan – Abbott Ministry, First and Second Turnbull Ministries, MHR for Stirling
 Chris Tallentire - First McGowan Ministry 2017, MLA for Gosnells

Legislative branch
 Matt Benson-Lidholm - MLC for Agricultural, Deputy President of the Legislative Council and Chairman of Committees
 Vince Catania - MLA for North West Central, MLC for Mining and Pastoral, Acting Speaker of the Legislative Assembly 2008
Tim Hammond – MHR for Perth

Judicial branch
 Jeremy Allanson - Justice of the Supreme Court of Western Australia

Public service
 William Foley (1931-1991) - Archbishop of Perth (CBC Perth)
 Launcelot Goody (1908-1992) - Archbishop of Perth (CBC Perth and also attended St Patrick's Boys School, Perth)
 Lloyd Rayney - leading prosecutor and defence barrister acquitted of the high-profile murder of his wife Corryn Rayney

Academia and science

Chancellors
 Peter Tannock – Vice-Chancellor, University of Notre Dame Australia, Chairman of the National Catholic Education Commission (CBC Perth)
 John Yovich - Vice Chancellor, Murdoch University

Chairs
 Peter Steele (1939-2012) - Professor of English Literature, University of Melbourne (CBC Perth)
 Peter Tannock - Professor & Dean of Education, University of Western Australia (CBC Perth)

Others academia and science
 Bruce Maslin - botanist

Art, entertainment and media
 Chris Allen - author
 Dave Faulkner – musician, Hoodoo Gurus
 Jason Gilkison – ballroom dancer and choreographer
 Alisdair McLaren - world champion bagpipe player
 Jeff Phillips - TV show host, personality and pop singer, 1970 Logie award for best new talent
 Alan Pigram - Scrap Metal & The Pigram Brothers - West Australian Music Hall of Fame
 Colin Pigram - The Pigram Brothers
 David Pigram - The Pigram Brothers - West Australian Music Hall of Fame
 Philip Pigram - Scrap Metal & The Pigram Brothers
 Stephen Pigram - Scrap Metal & The Pigram Brothers
 Mark Readings - STW Channel 9 sports presenter, radio sports commentator, 2003 Logie award for best news coverage of Bali Bombings
Joseph Ryan – musician, Pond

Business
 Warren Anderson - speculative investor (CBC Perth)
 Glen Bartlett - Melbourne Football Club President (see VFL under Sport)
 Michael Edgley – Managing Director Edgley International (CBC Perth)
 Herb Elliott, AC  - Chair Fortescue Metals Group, CEO Puma (CBC Perth, also attended Aquinas College) also listed under Athletics

Sport

Athletics
 Herb Elliott, AC - Rome 1960 gold medal 1500m Australia (CBC Perth, also attended Aquinas College) also listed under Business
 John Goodman - Melbourne 1956 silver medal 4 × 400 m relay Australia (CBC Perth)
 John Steffensen – Athens 2004 silver medal 4 × 400 m relay Australia, Beijing 2008, and London 2012 (also attended Guildford Grammar School)

Australian rules football
AFL
 Jacob Brennan – West Coast Eagles
 Michael Brennan – West Coast Eagles 1992 & 1994 vice-captain and premiership player
 Travis Colyer – Essendon
 Reece Conca – Richmond
 Mitch Duncan – Geelong 2011 premiership player (also attended Carine Senior High School)
 Andrew Embley – West Coast Eagles 2006 vice-captain, premiership player and Norm Smith Medal, Australian representative
 Alex Fasolo – Collingwood
 Jeff Garlett - Carlton and Melbourne
 Evan Hewitt - North Melbourne Kangaroos and Adelaide
 Josh Hill – Western Bulldogs and West Coast Eagles
 Jarrhan Jacky – Adelaide
 Kane Lucas – Carlton
 Paul Maher - Fremantle
 Nic Martin - Essendon
 Patrick McGinnity – West Coast Eagles
 Fraser McInnes - West Coast Eagles
 Murray Newman – West Coast Eagles
 David O'Connell – West Coast Eagles and Fitzroy
 David Ogg - Brisbane Bears
 Ashley Sampi – West Coast Eagles, Mark of the Year 2004
 Matthew Spencer - Geelong
 Lewis Stevenson – West Coast Eagles
 Luke Webster – Fremantle and assistant coach at Carlton and West Coast Eagles
 Sharrod Wellingham – Collingwood 2010 premiership player and West Coast Eagles

Others, Australian rules football

VFL
 Glen Bartlett - West Coast Eagles and WA state representative
 Ramsay Bogunovich - Geelong
 Craig Holden - North Melbourne, Sydney, WA state representative, Australian representative, All Australian 1987
 Gary Malarkey - Geelong, Victorian and WA state representative, All Australian 1979 - WA Football Hall of Fame 2010
 John O'Connell – Geelong captain, WA state representative - WA Football Hall of Fame 2012 (CBC Perth)
 Michael O'Connell – West Coast Eagles

WAFL
 Barry Kimberley - Swan Districts premiership player & Simpson Medal 1984
 Terry Moriarty - Perth, Sandover Medal 1943 - WA Football Hall of Fame 2010 (St Patrick's Boys School and also attended Aquinas College)
 Peter Tannock - East Perth, WA state representative, first Chairman of the WA Football Commission, co-founder of West Coast Eagles as Chairman of WA Football Development Trust (CBC Perth)

Bobsleigh
 Duncan Pugh - Vancouver 2010

Cricket
Australian Test Cricketers
 Beau Casson
 Simon Katich
 Mick Malone
 Craig Serjeant, vice captain
 Tim Zoehrer

Others, cricket
 Harry Gorringe - first-class Western Australia (CBC Perth)
 Dimitri Mascarenhas - England international cricketer

Cycling
 Henk Vogels Jr - Barcelona 1992 and Sydney 2000

Hockey
 John Bestall - Seoul 1988, & Barcelona 1992 silver medal Australia
 Kevin Carton - Australian captain (CBC Perth)
 Maurice Foley - Melbourne 1956 (CBC Perth)
 Eric Pearce - Tokyo 1964 bronze medal Australia & Mexico 1968 silver medal Australia - Australian Sport Hall of Fame 1985 (CBC Perth)
 Gordon Pearce - Mexico 1968 silver medal Australia (CBC Perth)
 Julian Pearce - Rome 1960, Tokyo 1964 bronze medal Australia, & Mexico 1968 silver medal Australia - Australian Sport Hall of Fame 1999 (CBC Perth)
 Mel Pearce - Melbourne 1956 (CBC Perth)

Motorsport
Supercars
 Alex Rullo - as a 15 year old Trinity student, became the youngest V8 Supercar driver in the competition history

Rowing
 Kenneth Chan - World Rowing Championships: 2000 men's lightweight eight bronze medal Australia
 Jack Cleary - Tokyo 2021 bronze
 Ben Cureton – Athens 2004 silver medal men's coxless four Australia, Beijing 2008, London 2012
 Rhys Grant - Rio de Janeiro 2016 men's single sculls
 Stefan Szczurowski - Sydney 2000, & Athens 2004 bronze medal men's eight Australia
 David Watts - Rio de Janeiro 2016 men's double sculls (also attended Churchlands Senior High School)

Soccer
 Matthew Davies - Malaysian international footballer, captain of Pahang FA, & Perth Glory
 Shaun Murphy - Socceroos 2001 Confederation Cup & famously scored the winner against Brazil, Notts County 1992-1997, West Bromwich Albion 1997-1999, Sheffield United 1999-2003. Crystal Palace 2001-2002, & Perth Glory captain 2003-2004

Swimming
 Jeremy McClure - Athens Paralympics 2004, Beijing Paralympics 2008, London Paralympics 2012, & Rio de Janeiro Paralympics 2016
 Antony Matkovich - Athens 2004 silver medal 4 × 200 m freestyle relay Australia
 Travis Nederpelt – Athens 2004 & Beijing 2008

Water polo
 Antony Matkovich - Sharks, Australian men's water polo team

See also

 List of schools in Western Australia
 List of boarding schools
 Public Schools Association

References

External links
 Trinity College website
 Trinity Old Boys' Association website

Lists of people educated in Western Australia by school affiliation

Lists of Australian men